Zarysly or Zarislu is a village de facto in the Shushi Province of the self-proclaimed Republic of Artsakh, de jure in the Shusha District of Azerbaijan. The village had an Azerbaijani-majority population prior to their exodus during the First Nagorno-Karabakh War.

One of the observation posts of the Russian peacekeepers in Nagorno-Karabakh in the context of the 2020 Nagorno-Karabakh ceasefire agreement is located near the village.

Gallery

References

External links 
 

Populated places in Shusha District
Nagorno-Karabakh
Elizavetpol Governorate